In Greek mythology, Belus (Ancient Greek: Βῆλος Bē̂los) was a king of Egypt and father of Aegyptus and Danaus and (usually) brother to Agenor. The wife of Belus has been named as Achiroe, or Side (eponym of the Phoenician city of Sidon).

Diodorus Siculus claims that Belus founded a colony on the river Euphrates, and appointed the priests-astrologers whom the Babylonians call Chaldeans who like the priests of Egypt are exempt from taxation and other service to the state.

Genealogy
Belus was the son of Poseidon and Libya. He may also be Busiris, son of Libya, ruler of Egypt, killed by Heracles, although Heracles was born many generations after Belus since he was a grandchild of Perseus; see Argive genealogy below. According to Pausanias, Belus founded a temple of Heracles in Babylon.

The Bibliotheca also claims that Agenor was Belus' twin brother. Belus ruled in Egypt, and Agenor ruled over Sidon and Tyre in Phoenicia. The wife of Belus has been named as Achiroe, allegedly daughter of the river-god Nilus. Her sons Aegyptus and Danaus were twins. Later Aegyptus ruled over Egypt and Arabia, and Danaus ruled over Libya. Pseudo-Apollodorus says that it was Euripides who added Cepheus and Phineus as additional sons of Belus.

In the Hesiodic Catalogue of Women, Belus was also the father of a daughter named Thronia on whom Hermaon, that is Hermes, fathered Arabus, presumably the eponym of Arabia.

According to Pherecydes of Athens, Belus also had a daughter named Damno who married Agenor (Belus' brother, her uncle) and bore to him Phoenix and two daughters named Isaie, and Melia, these becoming wives respectively to sons of Belus (their cousins) Aegyptus and Danaus. Yet another source says that the daughter of Belus who married Agenor was named Antiope.

Some sources make Belus the father of Lamia while Antoninus mentions him as the father of Thias (father of Smyrna) by the nymph Orithyia.

Nonnus makes Belus the father of five sons, namely Phineus, Phoenix, Agenor (identified as the father of Cadmus), Aegyptus, and Danaus, though Nonnus elsewhere makes Phineus to be Cadmus' brother. Nonnus has Cadmus identify Belus as "the Libyan Zeus" and refer to the "new voice of Zeus Asbystes", meaning the oracle of Zeus Ammon at Asbystes.

Belus and Bel Marduk
Pausanias wrote:
"<Ruler> Manticlus founded the temple of Heracles for the Messenians; the temple of the god is outside the walls and he is called Heracles Manticlus, just as Ammon in Libya and Belus in Babylon are named, the latter from an Egyptian, Belus the son of Libya, Ammon from the shepherd-founder. Thus the exiled Messenians reached the end of their wanderings."
This supposed connection between Belus of Egypt and Zeus Belus (the god Marduk) is likely to be more learned speculation than genuine tradition. Pausanias seems to know nothing of supposed connection between Belus son of Libya and Zeus Ammon that Nonnus will later put forth as presented just above.

Belus and Ba'al
Modern writers suppose a possible connection between Belus and one or another god who bore the common northwest Semitic title Ba'al. According to some sources, Belus was the son of Poseidon by Libya.

Notes

References 

 Antoninus Liberalis, The Metamorphoses of Antoninus Liberalis translated by Francis Celoria (Routledge 1992). Online version at the Topos Text Project.
 Apollodorus, The Library with an English Translation by Sir James George Frazer, F.B.A., F.R.S. in 2 Volumes, Cambridge, MA, Harvard University Press; London, William Heinemann Ltd. 1921. ISBN 0-674-99135-4. Online version at the Perseus Digital Library. Greek text available from the same website.
 Diodorus Siculus, The Library of History translated by Charles Henry Oldfather. Twelve volumes. Loeb Classical Library. Cambridge, Massachusetts: Harvard University Press; London: William Heinemann, Ltd. 1989. Vol. 3. Books 4.59–8. Online version at Bill Thayer's Web Site
 Diodorus Siculus, Bibliotheca Historica. Vol 1-2. Immanel Bekker. Ludwig Dindorf. Friedrich Vogel. in aedibus B. G. Teubneri. Leipzig. 1888-1890. Greek text available at the Perseus Digital Library.
 Hesiod, Catalogue of Women from Homeric Hymns, Epic Cycle, Homerica translated by Evelyn-White, H G. Loeb Classical Library Volume 57. London: William Heinemann, 1914. Online version at theio.com
 Nonnus of Panopolis, Dionysiaca translated by William Henry Denham Rouse (1863-1950), from the Loeb Classical Library, Cambridge, MA, Harvard University Press, 1940.  Online version at the Topos Text Project.
 Nonnus of Panopolis, Dionysiaca. 3 Vols. W.H.D. Rouse. Cambridge, MA., Harvard University Press; London, William Heinemann, Ltd. 1940-1942. Greek text available at the Perseus Digital Library.
  
 Pausanias, Description of Greece with an English Translation by W.H.S. Jones, Litt.D., and H.A. Ormerod, M.A., in 4 Volumes. Cambridge, MA, Harvard University Press; London, William Heinemann Ltd. 1918. . Online version at the Perseus Digital Library
 Pausanias, Graeciae Descriptio. 3 vols. Leipzig, Teubner. 1903.  Greek text available at the Perseus Digital Library.
 Redfield, B.G. (1989) The Concise Dictionary of Mythology, Peerage Books, London, pp. 28 & 30–31.
 Strabo, The Geography of Strabo. Edition by H.L. Jones. Cambridge, Mass.: Harvard University Press; London: William Heinemann, Ltd. 1924. Online version at the Perseus Digital Library.
 Strabo, Geographica edited by A. Meineke. Leipzig: Teubner. 1877. Greek text available at the Perseus Digital Library.
 Tzetzes, John, Book of Histories, Book VII-VIII translated by Vasiliki Dogani from the original Greek of T. Kiessling's edition of 1826. Online version at theio.com

Kings of Egypt in Greek mythology
Kings in Greek mythology
Children of Poseidon
Demigods in classical mythology
Baal
Egyptian characters in Greek mythology
Chaldea